Alfred Godfrey Imhof (6 May 1911 in St. Giles – 27 August 1963 in Paddington) was a British racing driver in trials, rallies and hill climbing. He was the winner of the 2nd RAC Rally that was held in 1952, driving an Allard-Cadillac J2.

Career

Before the war, he teamed up in trial with Ben Richardson and Michael Lawson, in the Candidi Provocatores trials team, on a 1936 LM Speed Model (chassis BBY 333).

In the immediate post-war period, he became an industrial designer at Allard and took part in the design of the K1 (two-seater), L1 (4-seater) models, and especially the competition J1, which he owned and competed Personally from 1946 to 1949.

He then became a London-based industrialist, owner of the His Master's Voice recorder factory, built in Oxford Street in the 1950s.

Family
His sister, Barbara Kathleen ("Betty"), married Major Arthur Frederick Frayling, OBE, chairman of the Hudson's Bay fur auction house in London and of the International Fur Trade Federation; their sons are Nicholas Frayling, Dean of Chichester from 2002 to 2014, and the educationalist and writer Sir Christopher Frayling.

Rally results

References

External links
 eWRC

English rally drivers
1911 births
1963 deaths